Jermaine McElveen (born August 29, 1984) is a Canadian football defensive end who is currently a free agent. He played college football at UAB.

Professional career

Tennessee Titans
He was signed by the Tennessee Titans as an undrafted free agent in 2007.

Montreal Alouettes
Spent 4 seasons with the Montreal Alouettes beginning in 2008. Recorded a career high 8 sacks in 2010

Hamilton Tiger-Cats
Signed with the Hamilton Tiger-Cats for the 2012 CFL season. Posted a career high 31 tackles.

Saskatchewan Roughriders
On May 23, 2013, McElveen was traded to the Saskatchewan Roughriders in exchange for WR Lyle Leong.

Montreal Alouettes
Upon entering free agency, McElveen signed with the Montreal Alouettes after a two-year absence from the team on February 13, 2014. He was released by the Alouettes on November 27, 2014.

References

External links
Montreal Alouettes bio 
UAB Blazers bio

1984 births
Living people
Players of American football from Atlanta
Players of American football from Chicago
Players of Canadian football from Atlanta
Players of Canadian football from Chicago
American football defensive ends
Canadian players of Canadian football
Canadian football defensive linemen
UAB Blazers football players
Tennessee Titans players
Montreal Alouettes players
Hamilton Tiger-Cats players